In the popular imagination, a lost city is a real, once-prosperous and well-populated area of human habitation that fell into terminal decline and whose location was later forgotten.

Lost City, The Lost City, or Lost Cities may also refer to:

Places
 Ciudad Perdida, a lost city on the Caribbean coast of Colombia
 Lost City, California, in Calaveras County 
 Lost City, Oklahoma, the landing site of the Lost City Meteorite
 Lost City, West Virginia, named for the nearby Lost River
 Pueblo Grande de Nevada also known as "Nevada's Lost City",  a complex of villages, located near Overton, Nevada
 The Palace of the Lost City, a luxury holiday resort near the Sun City casino and resort in the North West Province of South Africa
 Lost City, Marrangaroo, rock formation

Films and television
The Lost City (1920 serial), a film serial directed by E.A. Martin and starring Juanita Hansen
The Lost City (1935 serial), two science fiction films directed by Harry Revier and starring Kane Richmond
 The Lost City (1950 film), a Mexican drama film
 The Lost City (1955 film), an Italian-Spanish drama film
The Lost City (2005 film), a film about the owner of a Havana nightclub in 1958 directed by Andy Garcia
 "Lost City" (Stargate SG-1), a two-part episode of the television series Stargate SG-1
The Lost City (2022 film), a romantic comedy adventure film

Games
 Lost Cities (video game), an Xbox 360 game planned for release in 2008 and based on the card game
 Lost Cities, a card game published by both Kosmos and Rio Grande Games
 The Lost City (Dungeons & Dragons), a 1982 adventure module for the Dungeons & Dragons fantasy role-playing game
The Lost City (video game), a 2012 iOS point-and-click adventure game

Other uses
 Lost City (hydrothermal field), a field of hydrothermal vents in the Atlantic Ocean
 Lost City (novel), a 2004 novel by Clive Cussler
The Lost Cities: A Drift House Voyage, a children's novel by Dale Peck

See also 
 Lost (disambiguation)
 City (disambiguation)
 Atlantis, a legendary lost city
 Lost villages (disambiguation)